is a 1956 black and white Japanese film drama directed by Hiromasa Nomura.

The film is remake of the 1936 film drama of the same name Sisters of the Gion by Kenji Mizoguchi.

Cast 
 Michiyo Kogure
 Michiko Ono
 Tamao Nakamura
 Shintaro Katsu
 Haruo Tanaka

See also 
 Sisters of the Gion (祇園の姉妹 Gion no kyōdai), a 1936 film by Kenji Mizoguchi.

References

External links 
 http://movie.goo.ne.jp/movies/PMVWKPD24832/index.html

1956 films
Japanese drama films
1950s Japanese-language films
Daiei Film films
1956 drama films
1950s Japanese films
Japanese black-and-white films